Buchholz may refer to:

Places

Germany
Buchholz in der Nordheide, a town in the district of Harburg, Lower Saxony
Französisch Buchholz, a community in Berlin
Märkisch Buchholz, in the Dahme-Spreewald district, Brandenburg
Buchholz, Schaumburg, in the district of Schaumburg, Lower Saxony
Buchholz, Soltau-Fallingbostel, in the district Soltau-Fallingbostel, Lower Saxony
Buchholz, Mecklenburg-Vorpommern, in the Müritz district, Mecklenburg-Vorpommern
Gremersdorf-Buchholz in the Nordvorpommern district, Mecklenburg-Vorpommern
Buchholz, Neuwied, in the district of Neuwied, Rhineland-Palatinate
Annaberg-Buchholz, a town in Saxony
Buchholz, Saxony-Anhalt, a town in the district of Stendal, Saxony-Anhalt
Buchholz, Dithmarschen in the district of Dithmarschen, Schleswig-Holstein
Buchholz, Lauenburg in the district of Lauenburg, Schleswig-Holstein
Buchholz, Thuringia, in the district of Nordhausen, Thuringia
Galerie Buchholz, a chain of art galleries in Cologne and Berlin
Wittenberge–Buchholz railway

Belgium
Buchholz, a village in the municipality of Büllingen

United States
Buchholz High School, a high school in Gainesville, Florida

Marshall Islands
Bucholz Army Airfield, a US Army airfield in the Marshall Islands

Poland
 Buchholz, German name of Bukowiec, Bartoszyce County
 Buchholz, German name of Grabno, Lubusz Voivodeship
 Buchholz, German name of Grabowo, Stargard County

Other
 Buchholz (surname)
Buchholz hydra, a mathematical game on a labeled tree
Buchholz psi functions, a system of ordinal collapsing functions
Buchholz's ID hierarchy, a hierarchy of inductively defined mathematical systems
Buchholz relay, a safety device for oil-filled electrical transformers
Buchholz system, a chess ranking system